Bobby Hajjaj (born 7 April 1974) is a Bangladeshi politician. Hajjaj is the founder and chairman of the political party Nationalist Democratic Movement (NDM). He is also an Oxford scholar, an academic, and spearheaded a citizen empowerment movement called Shopner Desh.

Biography

Family background
 
Hajjaj was born and raised in Dhaka. His father is the business tycoon Moosa Bin Shamsher who is regarded as the founder of the labor export industry, which along with the readymade garments export industry, have been the bastion of Bangladesh's economic success. Hajjaj's grandfather Shamsher Ali was a government official in Faridpur during British Rule, and his forefathers were Islamic preachers by vocation. 
His mother is Kaniz Fatema Chowdhury. She is a scion of the famed Dhulai Zamindar family of Pabna, one of the preeminent Zamindari estates during the British Raj, and her father Abu Naser Chowdhury was the last rightful legatee to the estate. 
Hajjaj has two siblings. His sister Nancy Zahara is an entrepreneur and married to [Sheikh Fahim], son of Awami League presidium member Sheikh Selim. His brother, Barrister Zubi Moosa is a practicing advocate in the Supreme Court of Bangladesh. 
He is married to Barrister Rashna Imam, managing partner at Akthar Imam & Associates, one of the leading law firms in Bangladesh. They have two daughters, Inaaya Hajjaj and Nyaasa Hajjaj.

Education and career

He completed his initial schooling from Maple Leaf International School. He pursued higher education overseas, graduating from the University of Texas at Austin in the 1990s with a degree in political science. During his undergraduate years, he wrote for the university's student newspaper, he also worked in multiple State Senate and Gubernatorial election campaigns. After graduation he worked in the financial industry in the US for a year before returning to Bangladesh. Upon return he started work in business development and became a regular op-ed contributor to a few national English dailies, which included the Daily Star.

From 2003 onward he spent three years mostly outside Bangladesh engaged in business development and strategy consultancy in the US, Europe, and the Middle East. Hajjaj spent two years at Oxford University, where he first did his MBA (2006) and then pursued post-grad research in Strategy Science.

Since late 2009, Hajjaj has been stationed in Bangladesh. After his return, he worked as a lecturer and researcher in business strategy at North South University, and as a columnist with The Daily Independent, until late 2013. Currently he contributes to the Op-Ed column in Dhaka Tribune, speaking on social and political issues.
In late 2015, he launched a citizen empowerment movement ShopnerDesh through which he worked with youth all over the nation on issues including education, mass urbanization, and radicalism of youth.

Political career

2012: Appointment as Former President Hussain Muhammad Ershad's special adviser
2013: Jatiya Party and Ershad publicly confirms Hajjaj's role as special adviser. 
2014: Hajjaj received a lot of media attention for criticizing the controversial 2014 Bangladeshi general election in which the ruling party Awami League's primary opposition party BNP did not take part. He was detained by Rapid Action Battalion (RAB) officials for 20 hours, in late 2013; right before the 2014 elections. According to Hajjaj, Ershad had appealed to withdraw his candidature but it was accepted without any apparent reason.
2015: Announced independent candidacy for 2015 Dhaka North City Corporation Mayoral Elections on 21 March 2015.
2017: In April 2017 he officially launched his political party Nationalist Democratic Movement.

2015 Dhaka North City Corporation Mayoral Election

On 21 March 2015, Hajjaj declared his mayoral candidacy for the April North Dhaka City Corporation polls as an independent candidate. "I am declaring myself an independent candidate for the upcoming Dhaka North City Corporation polls as it is a non-partisan election. I was born in Noakhali. So, I want to take care of the capital," said Hajjaj while announcing his candidacy. He withdrew from the race on 9 April.

Nationalist Democratic Movement – NDM
The Nationalist Democratic Movement – NDM was established with the sole purpose of returning the power of government to the hands of the citizenry. It is a broad based party that practices inclusive politics and champions democracy and citizen's rights, and our inherent national values.
NDM stands on the four unshakable pillars of Bangladeshi Nationalism, Religious Values, Spirit of Independence, and Accountable Democracy, to build the nation of the people's dreams and to fulfill the dreams of Bangladesh's valiant freedom fighters.

Political views

Hajjaj is known for preaching tolerance and practicing non-violent politics. He has spoken out against the violent nature of Bangladeshi politics on national television. He has urged his political opponents from both Awami League and BNP to rise above their ideological differences and work collectively to build a better Bangladesh.

References

Bangladeshi journalists
People from Dhaka
University of Texas at Austin College of Liberal Arts alumni
Alumni of the University of Oxford
1974 births
Living people
20th-century Bengalis
21st-century Bengalis
People from Faridpur District